Limbang was a state constituency in Sarawak, Malaysia, that was represented in the Sarawak State Legislative Assembly from 1969 to 2006.

The state constituency was created in the 1968 redistribution and was mandated to return a single member to the Sarawak State Legislative Assembly under the first past the post voting system.

History
It was abolished in 2006 after it was redistributed.

Representation history

Election results

References

Defunct Sarawak state constituencies